We Global is the third studio album by Miami based mixtape DJ and Terror Squad member, DJ Khaled. The album was released on September 16, 2008. This was his third album distributed by Koch Records (now Entertainment One Music), and the first released on his We the Best Music Group label. The album's guest appearances from Game, T-Pain, Bun B, Rick Ross, Ace Hood, Plies, Akon, Trick Daddy, Lil Boosie,  Nas, Kanye West, Fabolous, Fat Joe, Sean Paul, Busta Rhymes, Pitbull, Casely and Flo Rida among others.

The album's first single, "Out Here Grindin" leaked on May 5, 2008. The song features Akon, Rick Ross, Lil Boosie, Trick Daddy, Ace Hood and Plies. The single debuted and peaked at number 38 on the US Billboard Hot 100. The album's second single was "Go Hard" featuring Kanye West and T-Pain. The song peaked at number 69 on the US Billboard Hot 100.

Critical reception

Steve 'Flash' Juon of RapReviews gave praise to "Out Here Grindin'" and "Go Hard" for having easily catchy beats and rhymes, and the rest of the track listing for carrying "mega crossover potential." He concluded that, "Khaled doesn't even act much as a producer, letting other hot mixers shine on his CD's, so he plays the role of "executive producer" at best. Even though I think We Global would be more honest if Khaled put the words "we present" in front of it, the road to the title has been laid down for one more run and Khaled's going to get as close with this one as any attempt thus far. Best of luck to him." DJBooth's Nathan Slavik found the record to be a "definite improvement" over We the Best, highlighting "Go Hard", "I'm On", "Red Light" and "Bullet" for utilizing its producers and artists well to craft "hip-hop chemistry", but was critical of songs like "Final Warning" and the title track for being "musically malnourished" and display Khaled overreaching as a musical curator, saying "In the end that means that if DJ Khaled is indeed a hip-hop coach than he’s put together a solid game plan on We Global, he just made some questionable substitutions and time-out calls."

Commercial performance
The album debuted at number seven on the US Billboard 200, selling 59,573 copies in the first week.

Track listing

 

Samples credits
"Go Hard" contains a sample of "Angel" by Madonna.
"Out Here Grindin" contains a sample of "What's Beef?" by The Notorious B.I.G.
"Red Light" contains a sample of "Trace of Your Love" by Joe Simon.
"What You Gonna Do to Me" contains a sample of "A Cold Day in Hell" by Wings of Plague.

Charts

Weekly charts

Year-end charts

References

2008 albums
DJ Khaled albums
E1 Music albums
Albums produced by Cool & Dre
Albums produced by Akon
Albums produced by Danja (record producer)
Albums produced by the Runners
Albums produced by DJ Khaled
Albums produced by the Inkredibles